was a private junior college in Kuji, Iwate, Japan. It was founded in 1935 by Tamasine Allen, an American woman preacher as a kindergarten, expanding to a school in 1952, and to a junior college in 1970, with a Department of Human Communication which offered courses in tourism-related English language, international business and the humanities. It was renamed the Allen International Junior College in 1995. Due to declining admissions, the school was closed in 2007.

See also 
 List of junior colleges in Japan

External links

References

Japanese junior colleges
Educational institutions established in 1970
Educational institutions disestablished in 2007
Universities and colleges in Iwate Prefecture
Private universities and colleges in Japan
1970 establishments in Japan
2007 disestablishments in Japan